Viktoriia Poliudina (born 29 June 1989) is a Kyrgyzstani athlete competing in middle- and long-distance events. She represented her country at one indoor and two outdoor World Championships.

Competition record

Personal bests
Outdoor
1500 metres – 4:13.34 (Cheboksary 2012)
5000 metres – 15:29.28 (Guangzhou 2010) NR
10,000 metres – 32:16.34 (Guangzhou 2010) NR
Marathon – 2:40:28 (London 2017)
Indoor
1500 metres – 4:25.36 (Hangzhou 2014) NR
3000 metres – 9:30.76 (Doha 2010) NR

References

External links
 

1989 births
Living people
People from Issyk-Kul Region
Kyrgyzstani people of Russian descent
Kyrgyzstani female middle-distance runners
Kyrgyzstani female long-distance runners
Athletes (track and field) at the 2010 Asian Games
Athletes (track and field) at the 2014 Asian Games
Athletes (track and field) at the 2018 Asian Games
World Athletics Championships athletes for Kyrgyzstan
Athletes (track and field) at the 2016 Summer Olympics
Olympic athletes of Kyrgyzstan
Asian Games competitors for Kyrgyzstan